Dan Ouellette is an American artist, illustrator, director, author and production designer. He began drawing as a child inspired by Escher, Dalí and Moebius. His drawings usually begin with very rough sketches and are intended to capture a moment of tension or eroticism. His art pushes his audience into areas where people feel less than comfortable, stating that the "US which is so puritanical, our bodies are usually a great source of anxiety and fear". As a production designer, he has designed over fifteen independent feature films in the past decade as well as numerous commercials and music videos.  He is best known as the director for the music videos Blue and Looking Glass by The Birthday Massacre, receiving over 4 million combined views on YouTube, and has directed music videos for the industrial band Android Lust. He has done production design for many films over the years including Chasing Sleep starring Jeff Daniels. Dan's artwork is strongly themed around surrealism and mostly done in pencil. As an artist he has exhibited widely. He has been published in numerous anthology art books including Bio-Mannerism which also features work by H.R. Giger and Beksinski, and he has been featured in magazines internationally. David Bowie commented while looking at Dan's art that he has noticed a strong influence of science fiction on contemporary art. Giger saw a different aspect, saying simply "Very bony." He grew to adore the cinema of Fellini and later to marvel at Lynch's Eraserhead. Rather than pursue a formal education in the fine arts he chose to study the craft of film making and after college he became a production designer working on feature films in New York City  starting with his work as a production designer for Hal Hartley in 1990 with Trust and then, in 1992, with Simple Men.

Filmography

Music videos
 "Stained" (2003) — Android Lust
 "Blue" (2005) — The Birthday Massacre
 "Dragonfly" (2006) — Android Lust
 "Looking Glass" (2008) — The Birthday Massacre
 "Here Comes The Rain" (2011) — Foetus
 "Beyond" (2014) — The Birthday Massacre

Other 
 "Dreams From A Petrified Head" (2012) science fiction screened at the Festival Internacional de Cinema Fantàstic de Catalunya
 "Frankenhooker" (1990) Production design
 Plays a lot of Sid Meier's civilation VI

References

External links

Sitges Film Festival Listing

Living people
American music video directors
Special effects people
American production designers
American illustrators
Year of birth missing (living people)